Robert Montague Noel (born 12 June 1964) is a British businessman, and the chairman of Hammerson since September 2020. He was the chief executive (CEO) of Land Securities, the largest commercial property company in the UK, from 2012 until March 2020.

Early life
Noel was educated at Marlborough College. He went on to study at Reading University and graduated with a bachelor's degree in 1986. is a qualified chartered surveyor.

Career
On 31 March 2012, Noel succeeded Francis Salway as chief executive of Land Securities. Noel had been managing director of the company's London properties, having joined Land Securities in January 2010 from Great Portland Estates plc, where he had been property director since 2002.

Noel has had other roles as chairman of the Westminster Property Association, a Director of The New West End Company and a trustee and director of the charity LandAid.

In March 2020 he stood down as CEO of Land Securities, and has been the chairman of Hammerson since September 2020.

In December 2022, it was announced that Noel would succeed Irene Dorner as chair of Taylor Wimpey after the company's April 2023 AGM.

Personal life
Noel and his French wife Sophie have a son and two daughters, and own homes in London and Frinton-on-Sea, Essex. Noel has a tattoo on his bottom (believed to be an elephant), obtained in Thailand in his youth.

References

Living people
1964 births
British chief executives
British corporate directors
Businesspeople from London
People educated at Marlborough College
Alumni of the University of Reading